Bademjin (also Romanized as Bādemjīn; also known as Bademjin Ghaghzan Sharghi, Batmadzhin, and Bātmajīn) is a village in Eqbal-e Gharbi Rural District, in the Central District of Qazvin County, Qazvin Province, Iran. At the 2006 census, its population was 149, in 32 families.

References 

Populated places in Qazvin County